Oberleutnant Hans Berr (20 May 1890–6 April 1917) was a German professional soldier and World War I flying ace. At the start of the First World War, he served in a scout regiment until severely wounded; he then transferred to aviation duty. Once trained as a pilot, he helped pioneer the world's first dedicated fighter airplane, the Fokker Eindekker "flying gun". Flying one, Berr shot down two enemy airplanes in March 1916 as his contribution to the Fokker Scourge. Berr was then chosen to command one of the world's original fighter squadrons, Jagdstaffel 5. Leading his pilots by example, Berr scored eight more victories in a four week span in October - November 1916 while his pilots began to compile their own victories. Hans Berr was awarded Germany's highest military honor, the Pour le Merite, on 4 December 1916. During a 6 April 1917 dogfight, Berr and his wingman mortally collided.

Early life and service

Hans Berr was born in Braunschweig, Duchy of Brunswick on 20 May 1890. He joined the army as an infantry lieutenant in 1908. When the war broke out, he was serving with Magdeburgisches Jäger-Bataillon Nr. 4 (Magdeburg Scout Battalion No. 4). A month into his war, on 26 September 1914, Berr was seriously wounded. On 27 January 1915, he was promoted to Oberleutnant.

Flying service

In March 1915, he transferred to aviation duty and began aerial service as an aerial observer. He subsequently took pilot training. Upon completion of pilot training, Berr was assigned to an ad hoc unit of Fokker Eindecker fighters at Avillers, France. Kampfeinsitzerkommando Avillers (Combat Single-Seater Command Avilliers, commonly KEK Avillers) was one of a number of similarly-named Eindecker tactical groupings of two to four planes. The Eindeckers were the first true fighter planes; with their synchronizer gear slaved to their machine guns, they could fire through their own propeller arc without damaging the blades and shooting themselves down. Berr used one of these "flying guns" to shoot down a Nieuport on 8 March 1916 over the Battle of Verdun and a Caudron eight days later.

As the impact of the revolutionary flying weapon wore off, and Germany's opponents developed their own fighters, Die Fliegertruppen des deutschen Kaiserreiches (Imperial German Air Service) was reorganized into Deutsche Luftstreitkräfte (German Air Force). Several actual Jagdstaffeln (fighter squadrons) were organized. KEK Avillers was expanded into a jagdstaffel (fighter squadron), and Berr was given command of this newly founded squadron, Jagdstaffel 5, on 31 August 1916.<

Berr in command

By 8 October, when the Luftstreitkräfte reorganization became official, Berr had been using his combat experience to teach tactics to his squadron. As the Autumn foul weather cleared enough for flight, both Berr and the new squadron began a run of victories that would result in its being dubbed the KanonestaffelIn ("squadron of aces"). 

Berr led by example. In the four weeks from 7 October to 3 November 1916, Berr shot down seven enemy airplanes and an observation balloon.   On 7 October 1916, he shot down two enemy aircraft over Combles, France. On an evening patrol on 20 October, his victim was a British Royal Aircraft Factory F.E.2b. Added to his two Eindecker victories, his third triumph while flying with his squadron made Hans Berr an ace. 

On 22 October, a French Morane Parasol fell under his guns. On 26 October, Berr shot down another British FE.2b at 1800 hours, followed up by a highly hazardous successful assault on an observation balloon ten minutes later. On 1 November, his victim was another Caudron. His last victory, his tenth, came on 3 November over a British BE.2C.

Now the awards caught up to the valor, as his pending nominations for awards began to be approved and the medals awarded. On 10 November 1916, he added the Royal House Order of Hohenzollern to his Iron Cross and other earlier medals. Germany's most prestigious military award followed; Berr was awarded the Blue Max on 4 December 1916. Berr was the last of the early German fliers to receive the Blue Max for eight victories.

Hans Berr would continue to lead Jagdstaffel 5, though with no further victories.

Death in action

On Good Friday, 6 April 1917, Berr and his wingman Paul Hoppe collided and were killed while engaged in a dogfight with No. 57 Squadron RFC.

Hans Berr is buried in the Alter Friedhof Teltower-Vorstadt cemetery, Potsdam, Germany.

Legacy

Hans Berr's leadership established Jagdstaffel 5 as one of the German military's premier units. At least eight aces besides Berr served in its ranks, including Hermann Goering and Werner Voss. By the Armistice, Jagdstaffel 5 had the third highest aerial victory score of any German fighter squadron, having amassed over 250 aerial victories.

Footnotes

References

Sources
 
 
 
 

1890 births
1917 deaths
Aviators killed in aviation accidents or incidents in France
German military personnel killed in World War I
Luftstreitkräfte personnel
Military personnel from Braunschweig
People from the Duchy of Brunswick
Prussian Army personnel
Recipients of the Military Merit Order (Bavaria)
Recipients of the Pour le Mérite (military class)